The rufous-breasted flycatcher (Leptopogon rufipectus) is a species of bird in the family Tyrannidae.  It is found in Colombia, Ecuador, far northwestern Peru and far western Venezuela. Its natural habitat is subtropical or tropical moist montane forests.

The rufous-breasted flycatcher can often be detected by its sharp, squeaky call, which it often gives while foraging with mixed species flocks.

References

rufous-breasted flycatcher
Birds of the Colombian Andes
Birds of the Ecuadorian Andes
rufous-breasted flycatcher
Taxonomy articles created by Polbot